The Sociological Educational Institute of the Russian Academy of Education (SEI RAE) is a Russian science organization in the area of Sociology of Education.

About the Institute 
A decision to found the Sociological Educational Center in the structure of the Russian Academy of Education was made on the 22 December 1992. The center started working fully in the beginning of 1993. Because of the structure reorganization of RAE it was renamed as Sociological Educational Institute in 2008. During this period of time more than fifty research works were carried out. Since the moment of its foundation the institute has been developing constantly: it accepts new employees, carries out research projects by orders of scientific and public organizations. A great variety of scientific works is being published and translations of important foreign sociological papers are being made.

Collaboration 
Nowadays the institute continues working and developing actively. It collaborates with such organizations, funds and instates as:

Institute “Open society”;
UNESCO
ISSBD
Ministry of education of the RF
World Bank
Moscow committee of education
Council of culture and art under the president of the RF
Academy of pedagogy and educational department of Riga (RPIVA, Латвия)
Trade and social policy Institute of Donetsk
Kiev Institute of problems in administration of Gorshenin
Eurasian national University of L.N.Gumilev (Republic of Kazakhstan)
Federal state institution “Federal Institute of educational development” (FSI “FIED”)
State institution “Moscow center of educational quality”
The Pushkin state museum of fine arts
Stavropol state agrarian university
Psycho-pedagogical faculty in Institute of natural sciences and liberal arts of Federal state educational institution of Professional higher education “Siberian state university” (Krasnoyarsk)
Krai state autonomous educational institution of additional professional education (advanced training course) of specialists “Krasnoyarsk krai institute of training and professional retraining of educationalists” (KKITPRE)
Moscow state educational institution of higher professional education “Moscow humanist pedagogical institute” (MHPI)
State educational institution of higher professional education “Moscow state regional university” (MSRU)
Moscow state budgetary educational institution of high education “Moscow theatrical college” under Moscow state culture institution “Moscow theatre of  O. Tabakov”
Slavic university in Moldova (Republic of Moldova)
Institution of the Russian Academy of education “Pedagogical educational institute” (PEI), Saint-Petersburg

The institute also takes part in a number of international projects.

Publications

2012 
 Sociology of education 2012. New collected stories based on the materials of sociological research which were carried out by Sociological Educational Center RAE team are published. Such questions are analyzed in the book: the influence of social differentiation on functional and institutional changes in the sphere of education, socio-cultural transformation of teenager and youth subculture. A number of articles is devoted to culture and art studies.

2011 
 Musdienu skoleni Riga un Maskava. In 10–15 years school-leavers will work in different spheres of national economy. Their activity will define the quality of public development. The research discovers social and pedagogical situation which is typical for modern pupils. A multifaceted comparison of pupils from Riga and Moscow is held (their value orientations, views and behavior).
 Sociology of education 2011. New collected stories based on the materials of sociological research which were carried out by Sociological Educational Center RAE team are published. Such questions are analyzed in the book: the influence of social differentiation on functional and institutional changes in the sphere of education, socio-cultural transformation of teenager and youth subculture.
 Sociology of education. These collected articles are based on the materials of sociological research which were carried out by Sociological Educational Center RAE team. Such questions are analyzed in the book: the influence of social differentiation on functional and institutional changes in the sphere of education, socio-cultural transformation of teenager and youth subculture.

2010 
 Chuchelo, Sobkin V.S, Markina O. The monograph is based on the results of socio-psychological research. Pupils from Moscow schools participated in the study (8, 10 grade). Such questions are analyzed in the book: peculiarities in the comprehension of film composition, psychological interpretation of key episodes which actualize sense formation and emotional experience during perception. Special attention is paid to the study of film influence on Self-concept transformation of teenager audience. Particular parts of the book are devoted to the comprehension of motivational structure of characters’ behavior as well as to the influence of personal bullying experience on motivational attribution of characters’ behavior.
 Sociology of education. These collected articles contain the materials of sociological research which were carried out by Sociological Educational Center RAE team. The articles show the results of socio-cultural transformation analysis in the sphere of education. Special attention is paid to the problems of socialization during preschool age. Changing of diverse stereotypes (in professional sphere, mass media, cinema and fiction) is discussed.

2009 
 Teachers’ attitude towards Common State Exam, Sobkin V.S. The monograph is based on the materials of sociological poll of 2334 teachers from 4 regions (Moscow, Moscow region, Krasnoyarsk krai, Stavropol krai). The work contains the analysis of teachers’ opinion of CSE adequacy as an objective measure of assessment and entry examination. Special attention is paid to social functions and risks of CSE in teachers’ point of view. The influence of CSE on diverse components of educational activity (aims, content, methods, forms of control) is discussed. Particular part of the book is devoted to improvement of teachers’ professional skills in accordance with CSE imposition.

2008 
 Monitoring of social consequences of informatization: what has changed at school during 3 years, Sobkin V.S., Adamchuk D.V. The monograph is devoted to the problems of educational informatization and the attitude of the participants of educational process (administrators, teachers and pupils) towards informational communication technologies. The monograph is based on the materials of sociological monitoring research carried out in 2005–2008. 11 219 people from 6 regions participated in the research.

2007 
 A student of pedagogical university: estimation of life and professional perspectives, Sobkin V.S., Tkachenko O.V. The monograph is based on the results of sociological research which were carried out under Complex programme RAE “Sociology of education”. It contains the materials of sociological poll of 1469 students from pedagogical universities of Moscow. The book analyzes peculiarities of selection to pedagogical universities, students’ motivation, professional plans. Special attention is paid to students’ attitude towards their education. Some parts of the book are devoted to the process of interaction between students and professors, combination of work and study, participation in scientific research work. The materials of sociological poll are analyzed concerning gender, age and socio-stratificational influences.

2006 
 Socio-cultural transformations in teenager subculture. These collected articles contain the results of sociological research which were carried out under Complex programme RAE “Sociology of education”. The articles deal with peculiarities of socialization during teenager period. The attitude of senior pupils towards migrants, teenagers’ participation in school self-government, political self-determination, life perspectives and fears are investigated. Special attention is paid to the influence of identification on inter-confessional and international relations.
 The attitude of the participants of educational process towards informational communication technologies, Sobkin V.S., Adamchuk D.V. The monograph is based on the materials of sociological poll (administrators, teachers and pupils) carried out in 3 regions of the project “Educational system informatization” (Krasnoyarsk krai, Republic of Karelia, Stavropol krai). The book deals with diverse effects of school education informatization which are reflected in both school activity and originality of socio-cultural situation, analyzes peculiarities of using ICT on different stages of pedagogical process. Motives and aims of using ICT are investigated. Special attention is paid to studying differences in the process of using ICT in diverse regions (cities, centers, settlements).
 Sociology of preschool age. . These collected articles are based on the materials of sociological research which were carried out under Complex programme RAE “Sociology of education”. Such questions are discussed in the articles: the influence of socio-stratificational factors on parents’ attitude towards preschool upbringing system, transformations of child's subculture (game activity), mass media, artistic activity. Special attention is paid to the relations child-parent (difficulties at adoption).
 Sociology of education: talks, technologies, methods. These collected articles are based on the materials of sociological research which were carried out under Complex programme RAE “Sociology of education”. The articles deal with important aspects of sociology of education connected with goal and value orientations of school education, socio-cultural technologies of institutional organization and methods of sociological research.

2005 
 A teenager: norms, risks, deviations. The monograph is based on the results of sociological poll of 3000 teenagers (7, 9 and 11 grade). Teenager subcultural transformations during preschool and youth periods are examined. Special attention is paid to teenager's inclination to deviant behavior: smoking, alcohol, drugs, fights, leaving home etc. Reactions of macrosocial surrounding (peers, parents, teachers) are analyzed.

2004 
 Tolerance in teenager and youth environment. These collected articles are based on the results of investigations carried out under Federal Target programme “Set formation of tolerant consciousness and prevention from extremism in the Russian community” (2001–2005). The book investigates displays of tolerance at different ages: pre-school age, teenager subculture and among students. Special attention is paid to peculiarities in teenager's attitude towards extremism and terrorism. The influence of social self-determination on actualization of tolerant/intolerant sets is discussed.
 Sociology of education 1980–2003. The book contains bibliography on sociology during the period of 1980–2003. It is formed by catalogues of large Russian libraries, publications in central magazines, monographs, scientific books, materials of conferences and web-sites.
 Sociology of education. These collected articles contain the results of sociological research which were carried out under Complex programme of Sociological Educational Center RAE. The articles discover formation of socio-cultural approach in the sphere of education in the 20th century, give characteristics of foreign sociological investigations. Special parts are devoted to concrete sociological research of teenager subculture, teachers and students.

2003 
 Age peculiarities in tolerance formation. The book is based on the results of investigations carried out under Federal Target programme “Set formation of tolerant consciousness and prevention from extremism in the Russian community: socio-cultural dynamic and institutional transformations”. The book investigates displays of tolerance at different ages: pre-school age, teenager subculture and among students. Displays of tolerance among informal groups (skinheads, punks, tolkienists, hippies, rappers) are discussed. The influence of identification peculiarities on tolerance and intolerance is analyzed.
Problems of tolerance in teenager subculture. The book is based on the results of investigations carried out under Federal Target programme “Set formation of tolerant consciousness and prevention from extremism in the Russian community” (2001–2005) and “Education in the Russian community: socio-cultural dynamic and institutional transformations”. The monograph examines peculiarities of different spheres of social reality: inter-confessional and international relations, interaction with representatives of informal groups, attitude towards representatives of risk groups (alcoholics, drug addicts, HIV-infected etc.).

2002 
 Sociology of family upbringing: pre-school age, Sobkin V.S., Marich E.M. The monograph is based on the results of sociological study carried out under investigational programme of Sociological Educational Center RAE. The book contains materials of sociological polls of parents and children of pre-school age. The work analyzes value orientations and upbringing strategies of parents, their attitude towards state pre-school system. Special attention is paid to the influence of demographic and socio-stratificational factors on the formation of parents’ upbringing strategies. A particular accent is made on revealing parents’ upbringing strategies used for boys and girls in full and one-parent family. The influence of parents’ upbringing strategies on child's development is investigated.
 Applied aspects of social engineering: sociology of education in post-revolutionary Russia (1917–1930), Faradgev K.V. The monograph is based on the analysis of publications edited in 1917–1930. The research was carried out under investigational programme of Sociological Educational Center RAE. The book analyzes institutional peculiarities of the educational system in post-revolutionary Russia, describes formation and failure of pedagogical movement, investigates language peculiarities in sociology of education, analyzes sociological research devoted to exposure of professional orientations and socio-cultural ideals of students and enlighteners.

2001 
 A teenager: virtuality and social reality, Sobkin V.S., Evstigneeva U.M. The monograph is based on the results of sociological study of teachers, pupils and PTS students. The work was carried out under investigational programme of Sociological Educational Center RAE “New informational technologies and mass media as forming factors of teenager and youth subculture”. The book analyses the significance of new informational technologies in leisure and informational space of modern teenagers, peculiarities of pupils’ interest in a computer world, the role of new informational technologies in educational process and the influence of regular computer use on academic success; access to new informational technologies of school pupils and PTS students is compared.
 Peculiarities of teenagers’ attitude towards computer games are examined: motivation, genre preferences, emotional state during games and consequences of computer games. Specificity of Internet use and content peculiarities of virtual communication are studied.
Jewish kindergarten in Russia: problems, contradictions, perspectives. Sobkin V.S., Elyashevich E.K., Marich E.M. The monograph is based on the results of comparative socio-psychological research of teachers, parents and children of Jewish and Russian kindergartens. The research was carried out under investigational programme of Sociological Educational Center RAE. The work analyses general life orientations of teachers, their professional sets, peculiarities of pedagogical realization, professional competence and satisfaction. Life values of parents, strategies of upbringing and their attitude towards kindergarten are investigated. Peculiarities of intellectual development and emotional state of children in their families and kindergartens are studied.

2000 
 A kindergarten teacher: life values and professional orientations. The book is devoted to the studies of socio-cultural peculiarities in mass media and computer influence on education. The articles are based on the materials of research works carried out in Sociological Educational Center RAE.
 Education and informational culture. The book is devoted to the studies of socio-cultural peculiarities in mass media and computer influence on education. The articles are based on the materials of research works carried out in Sociological Educational Center RAE.

1998 
Political sociology of educational reforms: power/knowledge in education, teachers training and research. The book was written by one of the leading American researchers in the field of education. Philosophical reasons and socio-cultural tendencies which determine reformatory educational processes are analyzed in the book. It realizes a complex philosophical, sociological and historical approach to studies of educational policy.
 Ethnos. Identity. Education. These collected articles are devoted to socio-ethnological problems of modern education. It contains the analysis of possible directions in research works, discussions about new conceptual approaches to social and national identity, descriptions of tendencies connected with national ethnic inequality in the sphere of education.
Some articles show concrete results of empirical investigations. Such aspects are analyzed there: the attitude of senior pupils towards national policy, specificity of formation value process of different national groups, the role of macrosocial surrounding in identity formation. The peculiarities of Self-concept of the Russian, Tatar, Bashkir, Tuvinian and Jewish teenagers are shown on the materials of psycho-semantic research. 
The book is addressed to specialists who work in spheres of pedagogy, sociology, psychology, ethnography and culturology. The materials can be used for a student training on sociological and psychological faculties, training courses for employees of educational organizations. 
 The research were carried out due to the Russian humanist scientific fund.
Russian teenager of the 90s: movement to risk zone, Sobkin V.S., Kuznetsova N. The report is devoted to the analysis of problems connected with sex education of teenagers and senior pupils. Such topics are considered in the report: aspects of social dynamic of teenager sex behavior, way of model translation of sex behavior in mass-media, modern family state in Russia, teenagers’ attitude towards family relations, teenagers’ awareness about sex relations, peculiarities of communication about sex relations.
 Types of regional educational situations in Russia, Sobkin V.S., Pisarskyi P.S. The book demonstrates socio-cultural macrotendencies which characterize modern state of educational system in Russia. Basing on factor and cluster analysis a model of socio-cultural educational typology of the Russian regions is formed. Dynamic changes of institutions, pupils’ contingent and employee potential are described. The book is addressed to scientific, educational workers, teachers and students of pedagogical universities.

1997 
 A senior pupil in the world of policy. The monograph is based on the materials of questionnaire poll of 1604 Moscow senior pupils. The poll was held by Sociological Educational Center RAE in spring in 1996 (it was the period of the election presidential campaign). The study describes pupils’ attitude towards a wide range of political aspects: government system, economy, social policy, military reform, prevention of crime, mass-media control etc. A special part is devoted to studies of the attitude towards political leaders.
 А teenager with hearing defect: value orientations, life plans and social relations. The book was written by one of the leading American researchers in the field of education. Philosophical reasons and socio-cultural tendencies which determine reformatory educational processes are analyzed in the book. It realizes a complex philosophical, sociological and historical approach to studies of educational policy.
 A teacher and a senior pupil in the world of artistic culture. The book reflects the results of studying the dynamic of artistic preferences of teachers and senior pupils basing on sociological polls (1976, 1991, 1994, 1996). This work discovers peculiarities of artistic preferences among teachers and senior pupils as well as the consumption intensity of different arts: visual arts, music, theatre, cinematography, fiction, TV-shows and periodicals.

1995 
 Value normative orientations of a modern senior pupil. These collected articles contain the results of sociological research which were carried out by Sociological Educational Center RAE team. The main goal of these studies is an attempt to show socialization peculiarities of a modern teenager in conditions of value normative uncertainty and social instability.

1993 
 Russian school at the turn of the 90s: sociological analysis. Collected articles are devoted to the analysis of Russian schools’ condition at the turn of the 90s and of the attitude of teachers, parents, senior pupils in general schools and PTS towards education.
 Sociology of education. This book is the first one in the series entitled “Studies on sociology of education”. The first part contains articles that deal with the problems of sociology of education. Impartial picture of the formation and development of sociology of education is depicted.

1992 
Socio-cultural analysis of educational situation in a megalopolis, Sobkin V.S., Pisarskyi P.S. The book presents the results of sociological poll of 2736 teachers, pupils and parents who live in Moscow. This poll was held in April–May in 1991. The research was carried out under scientific investigation project “Socio-cultural analysis of educational situation in a megalopolis” (Federal complex programme of scientific pedagogical studies of the Ministry of education of the RF “Educational development in Russia”).
 Sociological portrait of a PTS student (Professional Technical School), Sobkin V.S., Pisarskyi P.S. The brochure depicts the results of sociological poll of 2857 students who study in PTS. This poll was held under scientific investigation project Satisfaction in PTS system in medium and small cities (Federal complex programme of scientific pedagogical studies of the Ministry of education of the RF). The poll was held in 12 medium and small cities.
Dynamic of artistic preferences of senior pupils, Sobkin V.S., Pisarskyi P.S. The book shows the results of studying dynamic of artistic preferences of senior pupils on the basement of sociological polls held in 1976–1991. This work discovers dynamic of artistic preferences of different art genres: visual arts, music, theatre, cinematography, fiction. The popularity of diverse TV-shows and periodicals was analyzed.

Vladimir S. Sobkin 
Scientific interests: sociology of education; infant, age and pedagogical psychology; psychology of art. Sobkin Vladimir Samuilovich is the initiator and the author of many research works in the sphere of sociology of education. He made a considerable contribution in the development of theoretical and applied aspects of sociology of education, social, age and pedagogical psychology. Particularly he has worked out methodological principles of multiway sociological analysis of educational situation, suggested the idea of socio-cultural educational trajectories, investigated types of parents’ upbringing strategies. In the beginning of the 90s he was a co-head in the development of the first Russian Federal Target Complex Programme “Russian education during transitional period: stabilization and developmental programme” (1991). At the same time he was an adviser of the Minister of education on the problems of sociology, the head of social service and a member of Ministry board of education of the RF. In 1992 due to his initiative Sociological Educational Center RAE was established, and he became its director-organizer (up to nowadays). In 2008 the center was transformed into Institute of sociology RAE. It is the main organization which implements RAE complex programmes in the sphere of sociology of education. Under the guidance of V.S.Sobkin a number of large sociological research was carried out; it was aimed at receiving new fundamental knowledge and shaping scientific potential for the development of sociology of education as a scientific discipline. The results of these investigations are implemented into scientific pedagogical practice and accelerate quality changes in educational sphere, its transformation into a model of stable innovative development which provides institutional and functional modernization of Russian education, rise of its competitiveness. V.S.Sobkin is the head and the author of unique scientific research projects which were carried out within the bounds of Federal Target Programmes: “Educational development in Russia”, “The children of Russia”, “The children of Chernobyl”, “Set formation of tolerant consciousness and prevention of extremism in the Russian society” (2001–2005), “Informatization of educational system”. By the order of UNESCO an analytic report about deviant displays of teenager subculture was prepared (“Teenager of the 90s: movement to risk zone”). A great number of scientific applied studies were carried out under the guidance of V.S.Sobkin by orders of several ministries and departments (Ministry of education and science of the Russian Federation, Moscow Department of education, Regional governing authorities of education of Krasnoyarsk Territory, Stavropolsk Territory, Republic of Karelia, Omsk region etc.). The results of these investigations were used to work out regional developmental educational programmes. V.S.Sobkin is Doctor of psychology, professor, academician of the Russian Academy of education. He is the author of more than 400 scientific works, which were published both in Russia and abroad. Only during last years he published a number of monographs appreciated by scientific and pedagogical community: “Sociology of family upbringing: preschool age” (2002), “Problems of tolerance in teenager subculture” (2003), “ A teenager: virtuality and social reality” (2004, published in USA), “A teenager: norms, risks, deviations” (2005), “The attitude of participants of educational process towards informational communicational technologies” (2006), “A student of pedagogical university: estimation of life and professional perspectives” (2007), “Monitoring of social consequences of informatization: what has changed at school during 3 years?” (2008), “Teachers’ attitude towards Common State Exam (on the materials of sociological research)” (2009). In addition, more than 20 issues were published in scientific series “Studies on sociology of education” edited by V.S.Sobkin. Under the guidance of V.S.Sobkin Institute of sociology RAE has become a scientific institution which affectively explores the problems of sociology, connected with modernization of Russian education. Studies carried out in the institute were recognized by scientific and pedagogical community. Scientific employee team and V.S.Sobkin were awarded to Presidential Prize in the sphere of education in 2001. The institute has postgraduate course and trains qualified specialists among young scientists. A big number of Candidate Theses in sociology, psychology and pedagogy was successfully defended under the guidance of V.S.Sobkin. Now V.S.Sobkin is scientific head of Theses of 8 postgraduate students. He is a member of council on candidate and doctor theses defence in psychology (MSU, MPSU). Besides scientific and organizational activity, V.S.Sobkin is a chairman of Ethno-psychological section of the Russian psychological society, editor of scientific series “Studies on sociology of education”, a member of editorial board of the magazine “Questions of psychology”, “Questions of mental health of children and teenagers” and other issues. V.S.Sobkin was awarded to “Honorary Science Worker of the RF” (October 2008)
and was decorated with Medal “ For service to motherland” II Degree (April 2004), Medal “In commemoration of 850 years of Moscow” (October 1997). In addition, he has such awards: Badge “Honorary worker of general education of the RF” (2002), the President Prize in the field of education for the year 2001, Letter of commendation of the Ministry of education (April 2000), Medal of K.D.Ushinskyi “For service to pedagogic sciences” (June 1998), Golden medal of the Russian Academy of education “For achievements in science” (November 2007).

External links
ИСО РАО
Постановление Правительства РФ от 04.02.2008 № 45 «О Российской академии образования»
Фильм "Чучело" глазами современных школьников: Монография

Educational research